Letshego Holdings Limited is a microfinance holding company with its headquarters in Gaborone, Botswana and is listed on the Botswana Stock Exchange (BSE). Letshego is a Setswana word meaning “Support”.

Overview 
Letshego Holdings Limited is a Botswana-based financial services institution. The group had a market capitalization in excess of US$634 million, as at December 2015, thereby making it the largest indigenous quoted company on the BSE. The group serves more than 300,000 consumers, by its micro lending subsidiaries across ten countries in Southern, Eastern and Western Africa. These subsidiaries provide short to medium-term unsecured loans to formally employed clients. The Letshego group employed in excess of 2,300 staff as at December 2015. , the group's total assets were valued at BWP:7.462 billion (approx. USD:729.55 million), with shareholder's equity valued at BWP:4.182 billion (approx. USD:408.85 million).

History 
Letshego Holdings Limited was incorporated on 4 March 1998 as Micro Provident Botswana Limited a microfinance institution whose core function was to provide of unsecured loans clients, who had full-time employment. The company was listed on the BSE in 2002 through a successful IPO. The funds from this IPO were utilized to expand the group regionally.

Between 2005 and 2007, the group expanded to Uganda, Eswatini, Tanzania and Zambia. These were all through greenfield investments in these countries. In August 2008, the group made its first foreign acquisition when it acquired a majority stake in Eduloan, an MFI in Namibia. In the same year, the company adopted the Letshego brand as its official name. The expansion drive continued into 2009 with the setting up of a subsidiary in Mozambique.

In 2011, the group commenced its operations in Lesotho. In the same year, the group announced its intention to acquire a 62.52% in Micro Africa Limited, a Kenya-based MFI with subsidiaries in Kenya, Uganda, Rwanda and South Sudan. This acquisition gave group access to three new countries and an increase in its Ugandan customer base due to its pre-existing presence. This acquisition was completed on June 1, 2012. This saw the group have presence in 11 countries. Letshego Holdings took full control of Micro Africa Limited in 2013. On 1 December 2013 the group divested from Letshego Financial Services Zambia. With the exit from Zambia, the group's presence remained in 10 countries. In January 2016, Letshego Holdings Limited completed the acquisition of 100% shareholding in FBN Microfinance Bank of Nigeria.

Ownership 
The shares of the stock of Letshego Holdings Limited are traded on the Botswana Stock Exchange, under the symbol: LETSHEGO. , shareholding in the group's stock was as depicted in the table below:

Member companies 
The companies that compose the Letshego Holdings Limited include but are not limited to the following:

 Letshego Financial Services Botswana – 100% Shareholding – Botswana
 Letshego Kenya Limited – 100% Shareholding – Kenya
 Letshego Rwanda Limited – 100% Shareholding – Rwanda
 AMDC Limited (Mauritius) - 100% shareholding - Holding company for the Rwanda Operations.
 Letshego Financial Services Lesotho Limited – 95% Shareholding – Lesotho
 Letshego Financial Services Mozambique, SA – 96.25% Shareholding – Mozambique
 Letshego Bank Namibia – 85% Shareholding – Namibia
 Letshego Financial Services Swaziland (Proprietary) Limited – 85% Shareholding – Swaziland
 Letshego Financial Services Tanzania Limited - 100% shareholding - Tanzania
 Letshego Bank Tanzania – 87% Shareholding – Tanzania
 Letshego Microfinance Uganda – 85% Shareholding – Uganda
 FBN Microfinance Bank Limited  –  100% Shareholding  –  Nigeria
 ERF 8585 Limited - 100% Shareholding - Namibia (Real estate company).
 AFB Ghana- financial services

Governance 
Letshego Holdings Limited is governed by a thirteen-person board of directors with Enos Banda as the chairman and Aobakwe “Aupa” Monyatsi as the Group Chief Executive.

See also 
 Botswana Stock Exchange
 BSE DCI

References

Companies listed on the Botswana Stock Exchange
Financial services companies of Botswana
Financial services companies established in 1998
Holding companies of Botswana
1998 establishments in Botswana
Botswana companies